Ming Chee Sing Chinese Opera Troupe is one of the top Cantonese Opera troupes in Hong Kong. The troupe was founded in 1990 by Lau Kam Yiu to promote a young opera talent, Joyce Koi Ming Fai. Lau himself, a retired businessman, later took over the management of Ming Chee Sing.

After the demise of Lau Kam Yiu in 2011, Ming Chee Sing Chinese Opera Troupe came under the management of his daughter, Lau Kok Ying. The Troupe now performs at least 100 shows a year in many countries including the United States, Canada, England, Australia, Japan, China, Singapore, Macau, etc. It celebrated its 25th anniversary in October 2015.

Members

Leading male
Koi Ming Fai is the ‘man mou sang’ (leading male) of Ming Chee Sing.  She is a popular and well-known opera male impersonator, and the god-daughter cum disciple of Cantonese Opera maestro Lam Kar Sing. Since 1995, she has also acted in several Hong Kong TV dramas.  In 2001, she was awarded as one of the Ten Outstanding Young Persons in Hong Kong.

At first, Koi Ming Fai partnered her classmate Zong Yun Sin.  The two of them were both trained at  the Cantonese Opera Academy of Hong Kong.  After the initial performances, an experienced actress Wan Fei Yin, was recruited to take over as the leading lady.

Current leading actress
Since November 1994, Ng May Ying, a renowned leading actress, is the stage partner of Koi Ming Fai.  Their 21 years’ partnership is a record in Cantonese Opera circle.  They are considered to be ‘The perfect pair’ by many Cantonese opera fans.

Operas
The operas performed by Ming Chee Sing are mostly famous plays of Yam Kim Fai /Bak Sheut Sin, well-known operas of Lam Kar Sing, and those written by Li Kui Ming.

References
 ‘Traditional Opera’ by Louise do Rosário in Macao (Macao Magazine Issue No. 5, October 2010)
 Press release  “Ming Chee Sing Chinese Opera showcases Tong Tik-sang's classics” by news.gov.hk dated August 30, 2011

Theatre companies in Hong Kong
Cantonese opera troupes
1990 establishments in Hong Kong